Patrik Johansson may refer to:

 Patrik Johansson (footballer) (born 1968), Swedish footballer and football manager
 Patrik Johansson (bandy) (born 1988), Swedish bandy player
 Patrik Johansson (volleyball) (born 1963), Swedish volleyball player